Néstor Pedro Braillard Poccard (born 8 April 1954) is an Argentinian politician, who served as Governor of Corrientes Province between 1997 and 1999 when he was displaced by an impeachment. Also, he served as National Senator representing Corrientes between 2015 and 2021. Since 2021 he has served as Vice Governor of Corrientes.

He studied law at the National University of the Northeast, where he is now a professor in the Law Department.

References

1954 births
Living people
People from Corrientes
Governors of Corrientes Province
Members of the Argentine Senate for Corrientes
National University of the Northeast alumni
20th-century Argentine politicians
21st-century Argentine politicians